Škorić is a surname. Notable people with the surname include:

Dalibor Škorić (born 1971), Serbian footballer
Edin Škorić (born 1975), Serbian volleyball player
Irena Škorić (born 1981), Croatian film director and screenwriter
Josip Škorić (born 1981), Croatian footballer
Maja Škorić (born 1989), Serbian basketball player
Mile Škorić (born 1991), Croatian footballer
Ognjen Škorić (born 1993), Bosnia and Herzegovina footballer
Pero Škorić (born 1969), Serbian footballer
Sonja Škorić (born 1996), Serbian singer-songwriter
Zlatko Škorić (born 1941), Croatian footballer

Croatian surnames
Serbian surnames